William J. Floyd is an American mathematician specializing in topology. He is currently a professor at Virginia Polytechnic Institute and State University. 
Floyd received a PhD in Mathematics from Princeton University 1978 under the direction of William Thurston.

Mathematical contributions
Most of Floyd's research is in the areas of geometric topology and geometric group theory.

Floyd and Allen Hatcher classified all the incompressible surfaces in punctured-torus bundles over the circle.

In a 1980 paper Floyd introduced a way to compactify a finitely generated group by adding to it a boundary which came to be called the Floyd boundary.
Floyd also wrote a number of joint papers with James W. Cannon and Walter R. Parry exploring a combinatorial approach to the Cannon conjecture using finite subdivision rules. This represents one of the few plausible lines of attack of the conjecture.

References

External links

William Floyd's webpage, Department of Mathematics, Virginia Polytechnic Institute and State University

Year of birth missing (living people)
Living people
20th-century American mathematicians
21st-century American mathematicians
Topologists
Virginia Tech faculty
Princeton University alumni